Guillermo Mendoza Molina (born 25 June 1945), is recognized like GuilleMendo is a former Mexican cyclist. He competed in the men's tandem at the 1968 Summer Olympics.

References

1945 births
Living people
Mexican male cyclists
Olympic cyclists of Mexico
Cyclists at the 1968 Summer Olympics
Sportspeople from Mexico City